Trans-Asia (ICAO Code: TSX) was an airline from Kazakhstan, which operated a fleet of two leased Ilyushin Il-62M aircraft. The company was founded in 1996 and ceased to exist in 1999.

Accidents and incidents
On 24 April 1998, an engine of an Ilyushin Il-62M (registered YR-IRD) exploded shortly before take-off of the aircraft, which was operating a passenger flight from Istanbul Atatürk Airport on behalf of Trans-Asia. Due to the ensuing fire, the aircraft was damaged beyond repair. All 64 passengers and 9 crew members on board survived.

References 

Defunct airlines of Kazakhstan
Airlines established in 1996
Airlines disestablished in 1999